"Os Pinos" is the official anthem of Galicia, in Spain. The lyrics were written by Eduardo Pondal (the two first parts of his poem Queixumes dos pinos, "Lamentations of the Pines") and the music by Pascual Veiga. It was composed in Havana, Cuba, where it was performed for the first time in 1907. It was officially adopted by the Galician authorities in 1977.

Lyrics

In popular culture

In WC1982, at the Poland vs Italy match at Vigo, Os Pinos was played mistakenly instead of Mazurek Dąbrowskiego; however, Mazurek Dąbrowskiego was played after the Italian anthem beside the Spanish one.

See also
Anthems of the autonomous communities of Spain

References

External links
 Another translation into English
 

Spanish anthems
Regional songs
Galician symbols
1907 songs
Anthems of non-sovereign states
National anthem compositions in F major
Songs about Spain